The following lists events that happened during 1984 in Cambodia.

Incumbents 
 Monarch: Heng Samrin 
 Prime Minister: Chan Sy (until 26 December), vacant (starting 26 December)

Events

January

February

March

April

May

June

July

August

September

October

November

December

References

 
1980s in Cambodia
Years of the 20th century in Cambodia
Cambodia
Cambodia